

Home stadium
Since the mid-1990s, football teams from Karabakh started taking part in some domestic competitions in Armenia. Lernayin Artsakh is the football club that represents the city of Stepanakert. The Artsakh football league was launched in 2009.

The Artsakh national football team was formed in 2012 and played their first competitive match against the Abkhazia national football team in Sokhumi, a match that ended with a result of 1–1 draw. The return match between the unrecognized teams took place at the Stepan Shahumyan Republican Stadium, on 21 October 2012, when the team of Nagorno-Karabakh defeated the Abkhazian team with a result of 3–0.

Gallery

References

Nagorno-Karabakh
Football venues in Armenia
Buildings and structures in Stepanakert
Sports venues completed in 1956
1956 establishments in the Soviet Union
Artsakh FC
Sport in the Republic of Artsakh